New Vrindaban is an unincorporated area and an ISKCON (Hare Krishna) intentional community located in Marshall County, West Virginia, United States, near Moundsville. New Vrindaban was founded in 1968 under the direct guidance of A.C. Bhaktivedanta Swami Prabhupada, founder of ISKCON, by his disciple Kirtanananda Swami. It is named for the Indian city of Vrindavan.

Geography

According to the 2010 US Census, the six census blocks that make up New Vrindaban had a population of 352 and had the West Virginia status of unincorporated town. It is bordered on the north and northwest by Big Wheeling Creek, on the East by Stull Run, and on the southwest by the village of Limestone. The town's water and sewage utilities are provided by the New Vrindaban Public Service District, and following the Marshall County Commission's road naming project all streets in New Vrindaban have been fully named. In addition to ISKCON, the town is the location of McCreary Cemetery, resting place of West Virginia pioneer Lewis Wetzel; various locally owned businesses; and other ISKCON-affiliated organizations. The chief components in New Vrindaban's economy are tourism, agriculture, and cottage industries.

The religious organization ISKCON New Vrindaban is the largest holder of land in New Vrindaban with 38% of the land.  The nonprofit organization ECO-Vrindaban, Inc. holds 14%, and all other organizations and individuals own 48% of the land encompassing New Vrindaban. In addition to the previously mentioned organizations, as of 2010 jewellery manufacturer Lone Ones Inc., organic commercial bakery World's Best Cookie, Vaishnava Performing Arts Inc., and Vedic Heritage Trust Inc. had facilities in New Vrindaban.

History

The community was founded in 1968 by Kirtanananda Swami and Hayagriva Das, two early disciples of A. C. Bhaktivedanta Swami Prabhupada. New Vrindaban developed under the guidance of Kirtanananda Swami (honored as "Srila Bhaktipada" after March 1979), and by the mid-1970s the live-in population had grown to over 100. By the 1980s the population was more than 500.

ISKCON New Vrindaban is strictly vegetarian and believes that meat consumption creates negative karma. Alcoholic beverages and illegal substances (such as drugs) are prohibited in the main holy sites around the Temple of Understanding Circle Drive.

According to ISKCON News, on 4 July 1983 Vedavyasa Priya Swami installed the statue of Sri Nathji at the RVC Temple. Conversely, according to Gargarishi Das, the deity was not installed by Vedavyasa Priya, but was installed instead by Kirtanananda Swami.

In October, 1986, a census report showed 377 adults living at the community.

On March 16, 1987, during their annual meeting at Mayapur, India, the ISKCON Governing Body Commission expelled Kirtanananda from the society for "moral and theological deviations." The community of New Vrindaban was expelled from ISKCON a year later.

After Kirtanananda Swami left New Vrindaban, and new leadership stabilized, the community was readmitted to ISKCON in 1998. The Pittsburgh Tribune-Review reported in 2006 the population stood at about 100. However, this number only indicated how many people were members listed in the community directory rather than official census numbers.

Prabhupada's Palace of Gold

Originally intended in 1972 to be a residence for A. C. Bhaktivedanta Swami Prabhupada, the founder-acharya of the International Society for Krishna Consciousness (ISKCON), the plans evolved after Prabhupada's death in November 1977 for an ornate palace of marble, gold and carved teakwood, which was dedicated as a memorial shrine on September 2, 1979. Kirtanananda Swami, the leader of the New Vrindaban community, and Bhagavatananda das, the community's principal architect and sculptor, were the two primary forces behind its design and construction.

It reportedly cost $600,000 in materials, and the labor was donated by the devotees. The unpaid workers were often untrained and learned on the job.

Kirtanananda explained, "In the beginning, we didn't even know how to lay blocks. As our Krishna consciousness developed, our building skills developed, then our creativity developed, and the scope of the project developed."

Prabhupada's Palace of Gold opened in 1979 to positive reviews. CBS PM Magazine reported, "the magnificence of the Palace of Gold would be hard to exaggerate." Life magazine called the Palace "a place where tourists can come and be amazed." The New York Times proclaimed "Welcome to Heaven." The Washington Post called the palace "Almost Heaven." The Courier-Journal of Louisville stated, "It's hard to believe that Prabhupada's Palace is in West Virginia. In fact, it's hard to believe it's on this planet."

Beginning in the early 1990s lack of sufficient financial resources caused palace maintenance to be neglected; nevertheless, as of 2008, 50,000 tourists and Hindu pilgrims reportedly continued to visit each year. Since mid-2011, an ambitious five-year, $4.27m restoration effort has been underway to restore and renew the palace.

Gallery 1997–2007

References and footnotes
All information is sourced to the following article unless stated otherwise
 Rochford, Burke E. Jr.  and Kendra Bailey Almost Heaven: Leadership, Decline and the Transformation of New Vrindaban in Nova Religio: The Journal of Alternative and Emergent Religions Vol. 9 nr. 3 February 2006

External links 

 New Vrindaban Website
 Prabhupada's Palace of Gold Website
 Palace Lodge Accommodations at New Vrindaban

Populated places in Marshall County, West Virginia
International Society for Krishna Consciousness temples
Vaishnavism
Hindu temples in West Virginia
Religious organizations established in 1968
Religious buildings and structures completed in 1979
Religion in West Virginia
Religious buildings and structures in West Virginia
Vegetarian communities
Tourist attractions in Marshall County, West Virginia
Intentional communities in the United States
Asian-American culture in West Virginia
Indian-American culture in West Virginia
Buildings and structures in Marshall County, West Virginia
1968 establishments in West Virginia
Hinduism in the United States